Laetifautor elegans is a species of sea snail, a marine gastropod mollusk in the family Calliostomatidae.

Description
The size of the shell varies between 3 mm and 8 mm.

Distribution
This marine species occurs off Japan.

References

 Higo, S., Callomon, P. & Goto, Y. (1999). Catalogue and bibliography of the marine shell-bearing Mollusca of Japan. Osaka. : Elle Scientific Publications. 749 pp.
  Poppe G.T. (2004) Descriptions of spectacular new species from the Philippines (Gastropoda - Trochidae, Cypraeidae). Visaya 1(1): 4–19. page(s): 6

External links
 

elegans
Gastropods described in 1960